The 1970 Cincinnati Reds season consisted of the Reds winning the National League West title with a record of 102 wins and 60 losses, 14½ games ahead of the Los Angeles Dodgers. The Reds defeated the Pittsburgh Pirates in three straight games in the 1970 National League Championship Series to win their first National League pennant since 1961. The team then lost to the Baltimore Orioles in the 1970 World Series in five games.

The Reds were managed by first-year manager George "Sparky" Anderson and played their home games at Crosley Field during the first part of the year, before moving into the then-new Riverfront Stadium on June 30.

Offseason 
 October 24, 1969: Mel Queen was purchased from the Reds by the California Angels.
 October 29, 1969: Pedro Ramos was released by the Reds.
 November 14, 1969: Joaquín Andújar was signed as an amateur free agent by the Reds.
 November 25, 1969: Alex Johnson and Chico Ruiz were traded by the Reds to the California Angels for Pedro Borbón, Vern Geishert and Jim McGlothlin.
 January 14, 1970: Jack Fisher was traded by the Reds to the California Angels for Bill Harrelson and Dan Loomer (minors).
 January 17, 1970: Joel Youngblood was drafted by the Reds in the 2nd round of the 1970 Major League Baseball draft.
 February 4, 1970: Dennis Ribant was traded by the Reds to the Pittsburgh Pirates for Bo Belinsky.

Regular season 
Buoyed by a lineup that included third baseman Tony Pérez, NL MVP catcher Johnny Bench, right fielder Pete Rose, center fielder Bobby Tolan and first baseman Lee May, the Reds got off to a 70–30 start. The Reds, who had been near the bottom of the NL in pitching in 1969, were aided by a young staff that included 18-game winner Gary Nolan (22), rookies Wayne Simpson (21) and Don Gullett (19), 20-game winner Jim Merritt (26) and record-setting reliever Wayne Granger, who appeared in a then-record 90 games in 1969. Simpson, a hard-throwing former first-round draft pick, started the season 9–1 and earned an all-star berth. He was 14–3 before he suffered a season-ending arm injury with 30 games left.

Season standings

Record vs. opponents

Notable transactions 
 April 13, 1970: Al Jackson was released by the Reds.
 May 27, 1970: Arturo DeFreites was signed as an amateur free agent by the Reds.
 June 4, 1970: 1970 Major League Baseball draft
Will McEnaney was drafted by the Reds in the 8th round.
Ray Knight was drafted by the Reds in the 10th round.
 June 15, 1970: Clyde Mashore was traded by the Reds to the Montreal Expos for Ty Cline.

Riverfront Stadium 
Riverfront Stadium was opened in 1970, and it was the home of the Cincinnati Reds National League baseball team and the Cincinnati Bengals National Football League team. Located on the Ohio River in downtown Cincinnati, the stadium was best known as the home of "The Big Red Machine", as the Reds were often called in the 1970s. Construction began on February 1, 1968, and was completed at a cost of less than $50 million. On June 30, 1970, the Reds hosted the Atlanta Braves in their grand opening, with Hank Aaron hitting the first ever home run at Riverfront. Two weeks later on July 14, Riverfront hosted the 1970 Major League Baseball All-Star Game. This game is most remembered for the often-replayed collision at home plate between the home-grown Pete Rose and catcher Ray Fosse of the Cleveland Indians.

Roster

Player stats

Batting

Starters by position 
Note: Pos = Position; G = Games played; AB = At bats; H = Hits; Avg. = Batting average; HR = Home runs; RBI = Runs batted in

Other batters 
Note: G = Games played; AB = At bats; H = Hits; Avg. = Batting average; HR = Home runs; RBI = Runs batted in

Pitching

Starting pitchers 
Note: G = Games pitched; IP = Innings pitched; W = Wins; L = Losses; ERA = Earned run average; SO = Strikeouts

Other pitchers 
Note: G = Games pitched; IP = Innings pitched; W = Wins; L = Losses; ERA = Earned run average; SO = Strikeouts

Relief pitchers 
Note: G = Games pitched; W = Wins; L = Losses; SV = Saves; ERA = Earned run average; SO = Strikeouts

Postseason

1970 National League Championship Series

Game One 
October 3, Three Rivers Stadium

Game Two 
October 4, Three Rivers Stadium

Game Three 
October 5, Riverfront Stadium

1970 World Series 

After their win in the NLCS, additional injuries to Merritt and Granger caught up to the Reds against the Orioles. In three of their losses, the Reds had leads of 3–0, 4–0 and 3–0. The Reds' only win came in Game 4 on a Lee May 3-run home run in the eighth inning.

1970 World Series (4–1): Baltimore Orioles (A.L.) over Cincinnati Reds (N.L.)

Awards and honors 
 Johnny Bench, National League MVP Award (He was the youngest National League player in the 20th century to win the MVP Award.)

Farm system

Notes

References 
1970 Cincinnati Reds season at Baseball Reference

Cincinnati Reds seasons
Cincinnati Reds season
National League West champion seasons
National League champion seasons
Cincinnati